Despite the various English dialects spoken from country to country and within different regions of the same country, there are only slight regional variations in English orthography, the two most notable variations being British and American spelling. Many of the differences between American and British English date back to a time before spelling standards were developed. For instance, some spellings seen as "American" today were once commonly used in Britain, and some spellings seen as "British" were once commonly used in the United States.

A "British standard" began to emerge following the 1755 publication of Samuel Johnson's A Dictionary of the English Language, and an "American standard" started following the work of Noah Webster and, in particular, his An American Dictionary of the English Language, first published in 1828. Webster's efforts at spelling reform were somewhat effective in his native country, resulting in certain well-known patterns of spelling differences between the American and British varieties of English. However, English-language spelling reform has rarely been adopted otherwise. As a result, modern English orthography varies only minimally between countries and is far from phonemic in any country.

Historical origins 

In the early 18th century, English spelling was inconsistent. These differences became noticeable after the publishing of influential dictionaries. Today's British English spellings mostly follow Johnson's A Dictionary of the English Language (1755), while many American English spellings follow Webster's An American Dictionary of the English Language ("ADEL", "Webster's Dictionary", 1828).

Webster was a proponent of English spelling reform for reasons both philological and nationalistic. In A Companion to the American Revolution (2008), John Algeo notes: "it is often assumed that characteristically American spellings were invented by Noah Webster. He was very influential in popularizing certain spellings in America, but he did not originate them. Rather [...] he chose already existing options such as center, color and check for the simplicity, analogy or etymology". William Shakespeare's first folios, for example, used spellings such as center and color as much as centre and colour. Webster did attempt to introduce some reformed spellings, as did the Simplified Spelling Board in the early 20th century, but most were not adopted. In Britain, the influence of those who preferred the Norman (or Anglo-French) spellings of words proved to be decisive. Later spelling adjustments in the United Kingdom had little effect on today's American spellings and vice versa.

For the most part, the spelling systems of most Commonwealth countries and Ireland closely resemble the British system. In Canada, the spelling system can be said to follow both British and American forms, and Canadians are somewhat more tolerant of foreign spellings when compared with other English-speaking nationalities. Australian spelling mostly follows British spelling norms but has strayed slightly, with some American spellings incorporated as standard. New Zealand spelling is almost identical to British spelling, except in the word fiord (instead of fjord). There is an increasing use of macrons in words that originated in Māori and an unambiguous preference for -ise endings (see below).

Latin-derived spellings (often through Romance)

-our, -or
Most words ending in an unstressed -our in British English (e.g.) end in -or in American English. Wherever the vowel is unreduced in pronunciation (e.g., contour, paramour, troubadour, and velour), the spelling is uniform everywhere.

Most words of this kind came from Latin, where the ending was spelled -or. They were first adopted into English from early Old French, and the ending was spelled -our, -or or -ur. After the Norman conquest of England, the ending became -our to match the later Old French spelling. The -our ending was used not only in new English borrowings, but was also applied to the earlier borrowings that had used -or. However, -or was still sometimes found. The first three folios of Shakespeare's plays used both spellings before they were standardised to -our in the Fourth Folio of 1685. After the Renaissance, new borrowings from Latin were taken up with their original -or ending, and many words once ending in -our (for example, chancellour and governour) reverted to -or. Many words of the -our/or group do not have a Latin counterpart that ends in -or; for example, armo(u)r, behavio(u)r, harbo(u)r, neighbo(u)r; also arbo(u)r, meaning "shelter", though senses "tree" and "tool" are always arbor, a false cognate of the other word. Some 16th- and early 17th-century British scholars indeed insisted that -or be used for words from Latin (e.g.) and -our for French loans; but in many cases the etymology was not clear, and therefore some scholars advocated -or only and others -our only.

Webster's 1828 dictionary had only -or and is given much of the credit for the adoption of this form in the United States. By contrast, Johnson's 1755 (pre-U.S. independence and establishment) dictionary used -our for all words still so spelled in Britain (like colour), but also for words where the u has since been dropped: ambassadour, emperour, governour, inferiour, perturbatour, superiour; errour, horrour, mirrour, tenour, terrour, tremour. Johnson, unlike Webster, was not an advocate of spelling reform, but chose the spelling best derived, as he saw it, from among the variations in his sources. He preferred French over Latin spellings because, as he put it, "the French generally supplied us". English speakers who moved to America took these preferences with them. In the early 20th century, H. L. Mencken notes that " appears in the 1776 Declaration of Independence, but it seems to have been put there rather by accident than by design". In Jefferson's original draft it is spelled "honour". In Britain, examples of  rarely appear in Old Bailey court records from the 17th and 18th centuries, whereas there are thousands of examples of their -our counterparts.

Derivatives and inflected forms
In derivatives and inflected forms of the -our/or words, British usage depends on the nature of the suffix used. The u is kept before English suffixes that are freely attachable to English words (for example in ) and suffixes of Greek or Latin origin that have been adopted into English (for example in ). However, before Latin suffixes that are not freely attachable to English words, the u:
 may be dropped, for example in honorary, honorific, humorist, humorous, invigorate, laborious, and vigorous;
 may be either dropped or kept, for example in colo(u)ration and colo(u)rize or colourise; or

In American usage, derivatives and inflected forms are built by simply adding the suffix in all cases (for example,  etc.) since the u is absent to begin with.

Exceptions
American usage, in most cases, keeps the u in the word glamour, which comes from Scots, not Latin or French.  is sometimes used in imitation of the spelling reform of other -our words to -or. The name of the  has a u in it because the spacecraft was named after British Captain James Cook's ship, . The (former) special car on Amtrak's Coast Starlight train is known as the Pacific Parlour car, not Pacific Parlor. Proper names such as Pearl Harbor or Sydney Harbour are usually spelled according to their native-variety spelling vocabulary.

The name of the herb savory is spelled thus everywhere, although the related adjective savo(u)ry, like savo(u)r, has a u in the UK. Honor (the name) and arbor (the tool) have -or in Britain, as mentioned above, as does the word pallor. As a general noun, rigour  has a u in the UK; the medical term rigor (sometimes ) does not, such as in rigor mortis, which is Latin. Derivations of rigour/rigor such as rigorous, however, are typically spelled without a u, even in the UK. Words with the ending -irior, -erior or similar are spelled thus everywhere.

The word armour was once somewhat common in American usage but has disappeared except in some brand names such as Under Armour.

The agentive suffix -or (separator, elevator, translator, animator, etc.) is spelled thus both in American and British English.

Commonwealth usage
Commonwealth countries normally follow British usage. Canadian English most commonly uses the -our ending and -our- in derivatives and inflected forms. However, owing to the close historic, economic, and cultural relationship with the United States, -or endings are also sometimes used. Throughout the late 19th and early to mid-20th century, most Canadian newspapers chose to use the American usage of -or endings, originally to save time and money in the era of manual movable type. However, in the 1990s, the majority of Canadian newspapers officially updated their spelling policies to the British usage of -our. This coincided with a renewed interest in Canadian English, and the release of the updated Gage Canadian Dictionary in 1997 and the first Canadian Oxford Dictionary in 1998. Historically, most libraries and educational institutions in Canada have supported the use of the Oxford English Dictionary rather than the American Webster's Dictionary. Today, the use of a distinctive set of Canadian English spellings is viewed by many Canadians as one of the unique aspects of Canadian culture (especially when compared to the United States).

In Australia, -or endings enjoyed some use throughout the 19th century and in the early 20th century. Like Canada, though, most major Australian newspapers have switched from "-or" endings to "-our" endings. The "-our" spelling is taught in schools nationwide as part of the Australian curriculum. On top of that, some place names in South Australia such as Victor Harbor, Franklin Harbor or Outer Harbor are usually spelled with the -or spellings. Aside from that, -our is now almost universal in Australia but the -or endings remain a minority variant. New Zealand English, while sharing some words and syntax with Australian English, follows British usage.

-re, -er
In British English, some words from French, Latin or Greek end with a consonant followed by an unstressed -re (pronounced ). In modern American English, most of these words have the ending -er. The difference is most common for words ending -bre or -tre: British spellings  all have -er in American spelling.

In Britain, both -re and -er spellings were common before Johnson's 1755 dictionary was published. Following this, -re became the most common usage in Britain. In the United States, following the publication of Webster's Dictionary in the early 19th century, American English became more standardized, exclusively using the -er spelling.

In addition, spelling of some words have been changed from -re to -er in both varieties. These include September, October, November, December, chamber, chapter, disaster, enter, filter, letter, member, minister, monster, number, offer, oyster, powder, proper, semester, sober, tender, and tiger. Words using the "-meter" suffix (from Ancient Greek -μέτρον métron, via French -mètre) normally had the -re spelling from earliest use in English but were superseded by -er. Examples include thermometer and barometer.

The e preceding the r is kept in American-inflected forms of nouns and verbs, for example, which are  respectively in British English. According to the OED,  is a "word ... of 3 syllables (in careful pronunciation)" (i.e.), yet there is no vowel in the spelling corresponding to the second syllable. The OED third edition (revised entry of June 2016) allows either two or three syllables. On the Oxford Dictionaries Online website, the three-syllable version is listed only as the American pronunciation of centering. The e is dropped for other derivations, for example, central, fibrous, spectral. But, the existence of related words without e before the r is not proof for the existence of an -re British spelling: for example, entry and entrance come from enter, which has not been spelled entre for centuries.

The difference relates only to root words; -er rather than -re is universal as a suffix for agentive (reader, user, winner) and comparative (louder, nicer) forms. But, while "" is often spelled as -re, pentameter, hexameter, etc. are always -er.

Exceptions
Many other words have -er in British English. These include Germanic words, such as anger, mother, timber and water, and such Romance-derived words as danger, quarter and river.

The spellings euchre and ogre are also the same in both British and American English.

Fire and its associated adjective fiery are the same in both British and American English, although the noun was spelled fier in Old and Middle English.

  is the prevailing American spelling used to refer to both the dramatic arts and buildings where stage performances and screenings of films take place (i.e., ""); for example, a national newspaper such as The New York Times would use  in its entertainment section. However, the spelling theatre appears in the names of many New York City theatres on Broadway (cf. Broadway theatre) and elsewhere in the United States. In 2003, the American National Theatre was referred to by The New York Times as the "American National ", but the organization uses "re" in the spelling of its name. The John F. Kennedy Center for the Performing Arts in Washington, D.C. has the more common American spelling  in its references to The Eisenhower Theater, part of the Kennedy Center. Some cinemas outside New York also use the theatre spelling. (The word "theater" in American English is a place where both stage performances and screenings of films take place, but in British English a "theatre" is where stage performances take place but not film screenings – these take place in a cinema,) or "picture theatre" in Australia.

In the United States, the spelling theatre is sometimes used when referring to the art form of theatre, while the building itself, as noted above, generally is spelled theater. For example, the University of Wisconsin–Madison has a "Department of Theatre and Drama", which offers courses that lead to the "Bachelor of Arts in Theatre", and whose professed aim is "to prepare our graduate students for successful 21st Century careers in the theatre both as practitioners and scholars".

Some placenames in the United States use Centre in their names. Examples include the Stonebriar Centre mall, the cities of Rockville Centre and Centreville, Centre County and Centre College. Sometimes, these places were named before spelling changes but more often the spelling serves as an affectation. Proper names are usually spelled according to their native-variety spelling vocabulary; so, for instance, although Peter is the usual form of the male given name, as a surname both the spellings Peter and Petre (the latter notably borne by a British lord) are found.

For British , the American practice varies: the Merriam-Webster Dictionary prefers the -re spelling, but The American Heritage Dictionary of the English Language prefers the -er spelling.

More recent French loanwords keep the -re spelling in American English. These are not exceptions when a French-style pronunciation is used ( rather than ), as with double entendre, genre and oeuvre. However, the unstressed  pronunciation of an -er ending is used  with some words, including cadre, macabre, maître d', Notre Dame, piastre, and timbre.

Commonwealth usage
The -re endings are mostly standard throughout the Commonwealth. The -er spellings are recognized as minor variants in Canada, partly due to United States influence. They are sometimes used in proper names (such as Toronto's controversially named Centerpoint Mall).

-ce, -se
For advice/advise and device/devise, American English and British English both keep the noun–verb distinction both graphically and phonetically (where the pronunciation is - for the noun and - for the verb). For licence/license or practice/practise, British English also keeps the noun–verb distinction graphically (although phonetically the two words in each pair are homophones with - pronunciation). On the other hand, American English uses license and practice for both nouns and verbs (with - pronunciation in both cases too).

American English has kept the Anglo-French spelling for defense and offense, which are defence and offence in British English. Likewise, there are the American pretense and British pretence; but derivatives such as defensive, offensive, and pretension are always thus spelled in both systems.

Australian and Canadian usage generally follows British.

-xion, -ction
The spelling connexion is now rare in everyday British usage, its use lessening as knowledge of Latin attenuates, and it has almost never been used in the US: the more common connection has become the standard worldwide. According to the Oxford English Dictionary the older spelling is more etymologically conservative, since the original Latin word had -xio-. The American usage comes from Webster, who abandoned -xion and preferred -ction. Connexion was still the house style of The Times of London until the 1980s and was still used by Post Office Telecommunications for its telephone services in the 1970s, but had by then been overtaken by connection in regular usage (for example, in more popular newspapers). Connexion (and its derivatives connexional and connexionalism) is still in use by the Methodist Church of Great Britain to refer to the whole church as opposed to its constituent districts, circuits and local churches, whereas the US-majority United Methodist Church uses Connection.

Complexion (which comes from complex) is standard worldwide and complection is rare. However, the adjective complected (as in "dark-complected"), although sometimes proscribed, is on equal ground in the US with complexioned. It is not used in this way in the UK, although there exists a rare alternative meaning of complicated.

In some cases, words with "old-fashioned" spellings are retained widely in the US for historical reasons (cf. connexionalism).

Greek-derived and Latin-derived spellings

ae and oe

Many words, especially medical words, that are written with ae/æ or oe/œ in British English are written with just an e in American English. Examples (with non-American letter in bold): aeon, anaemia, anaesthesia, caecum, caesium, coeliac, diarrhoea, encyclopaedia, faeces, foetal, gynaecology, haemoglobin, haemophilia, leukaemia, oesophagus, oestrogen, orthopaedic, palaeontology, paediatric, paedophile. Oenology is acceptable in American English but is deemed a minor variant of enology, whereas although archeology and ameba exist in American English, the British versions amoeba and archaeology are more common. The chemical haem (named as a shortening of haemoglobin) is spelled heme in American English, to avoid confusion with hem.

Canadian English mostly follows American English in this respect, although it is split on gynecology (e.g. Society of Obstetricians and Gynaecologists of Canada vs. the Canadian Medical Association's Canadian specialty profile of Obstetrics/gynecology). Pediatrician is preferred roughly 10 to 1 over paediatrician, while foetal and oestrogen are similarly uncommon.

Words that can be spelled either way in American English include aesthetics and archaeology (which usually prevail over esthetics and archeology), as well as palaestra, for which the simplified form palestra is described by Merriam-Webster as "chiefly Brit[ish]."

Words that can be spelled either way in British English include chamaeleon, encyclopaedia, homoeopathy, mediaeval (a minor variant in both AmE and BrE), foetid and foetus. The spellings foetus and foetal are Britishisms based on a mistaken etymology. The etymologically correct original spelling fetus reflects the Latin original and is the standard spelling in medical journals worldwide; the Oxford English Dictionary notes that "In Latin manuscripts both fētus and foetus are used".

<αι> and <οι>, which are diphthongs in Ancient Greek, were transliterated into Latin as <ae> and <oe>. The ligatures æ and œ were introduced when the sounds became monophthongs, and later applied to words not of Greek origin, in both Latin (for example, cœli) and French (for example, œuvre). In English, which has adopted words from all three languages, it is now usual to replace Æ/æ with Ae/ae and Œ/œ with Oe/oe. In many words, the digraph has been reduced to a lone e in all varieties of English: for example, oeconomics, praemium, and aenigma. In others, it is kept in all varieties: for example, phoenix, and usually subpoena, but Phenix in Virginia. This is especially true of names: Aegean (the sea), Caesar, Oedipus, Phoebe, etc. There is no reduction of Latin -ae plurals (e.g., larvae); nor where the digraph <ae>/<oe> does not result from the Greek-style ligature: for example, maelstrom, toe. The British form aeroplane is an instance (compare other aero- words such as aerosol). The now chiefly North American airplane is not a respelling but a recoining, modelled after airship and aircraft. The word airplane dates from 1907, at which time the prefix aero- was trisyllabic, often written aëro-.

Commonwealth usage
In Canada, e is generally preferred over oe and often over ae, but oe and ae are sometimes found in academic and scientific writing as well as government publications (for example the fee schedule of the Ontario Health Insurance Plan) and some words such as palaeontology or aeon. In Australia, it can go either way such being medieval is spelt with the e rather than ae, as with American usage along with numerous other words such as eon or fetus, while other words such as oestrogen or paediatrician go the British way. The Macquarie Dictionary also notes a growing tendency towards replacing ae and oe with e worldwide and with the exception of manoeuvre, all British or American spellings are acceptable variants. Elsewhere, the British usage prevails, but the spellings with just e are increasingly used. Manoeuvre is the only spelling in Australia, and the most common one in Canada, where maneuver and manoeuver are also sometimes found.

Greek-derived spellings (often through Latin and Romance)

-ise, -ize (-isation, -ization)

Origin and recommendations
The -ize spelling is often incorrectly seen as an Americanism in Britain. It has been in use since the 15th century, predating the -ise spelling by over a century. The verb-forming suffix -ize comes directly from Ancient Greek  or Late Latin , while -ise comes via French . The Oxford English Dictionary recommends -ize and lists the -ise form as an alternative.

Publications by Oxford University Press (OUP)—such as Henry Watson Fowler's A Dictionary of Modern English Usage, Hart's Rules, and The Oxford Guide to English Usage—also recommend -ize. However, Robert Allan's Pocket Fowler's Modern English Usage considers either spelling to be acceptable anywhere but the U.S.

Usage
American spelling avoids -ise endings in words like organize, realize and recognize.

British spelling mostly uses -ise (organise, realise, recognise), though -ize is sometimes used. The ratio between -ise and -ize stood at 3:2 in the British National Corpus up to 2002. The spelling -ise is more commonly used in UK mass media and newspapers, including The Times (which switched conventions in 1992), The Daily Telegraph, The Economist and the BBC. The Government of the United Kingdom additionally uses -ise, stating "do not use Americanisms" justifying that the spelling "is often seen as such". The -ize form is known as Oxford spelling and is used in publications of the Oxford University Press, most notably the Oxford English Dictionary, and of other academic publishers such as Nature, the Biochemical Journal and The Times Literary Supplement. It can be identified using the IETF language tag en-GB-oxendict (or, historically, by en-GB-oed).

In Ireland, India, Australia, and New Zealand -ise spellings strongly prevail: the -ise form is preferred in Australian English at a ratio of about 3:1 according to the Macquarie Dictionary. 

In Canada, the -ize ending is more common, although the Ontario Public School Spelling Book spelt most words in the -ize form, but allowed for duality with a page insert as late as the 1970s, noting: though the -ize spelling was in fact the convention used in the OED, that a choice to spell such words in the -ise form was a matter of personal preference, however a pupil having made the decision, one way or the other, thereafter ought to write uniformly not only for a given word, but to apply that same uniformity consistently for all words where the option is found. Just as with -yze spellings, however, in Canada the ize form remains the preferred or more common spelling, though both can still be found, yet the -ise variation, once more common amongst older Canadians, is increasingly employed less often in favour of the -ize spelling. (The alternate convention offered as a matter of choice may have been due to the fact that although there were an increasing number of American and British based dictionaries with Canadian Editions by the late 1970s, these were largely only supplemental in terms of vocabulary with subsequent definitions. It wasn't until the mid-1990s that Canadian based dictionaries became increasingly common.)

Worldwide, -ize endings prevail in scientific writing and are commonly used by many international organizations, such as United Nations Organizations (such as the World Health Organization and the International Civil Aviation Organization) and the International Organization for Standardization (but not by the Organisation for Economic Co-operation and Development). The European Union's style guides require the usage of -ise. Proofreaders at the EU's Publications Office ensure consistent spelling in official publications such as the Official Journal of the European Union (where legislation and other official documents are published), but the -ize spelling may be found in other documents.

The same applies to inflections and derivations such as colonised/colonized and modernisation/modernization.

Exceptions
 Some verbs take only an -ize form worldwide. In these, -ize is not a suffix, so does not ultimately come from Ancient Greek : for example, capsize, seize (except in the legal phrases to be seised of or to stand seised to), size and prize (meaning value, as opposed to the prise that means pry). 
 Some verbs take only -s- worldwide: advertise, advise, arise, chastise, circumcise, comprise, compromise, demise, despise, devise, disguise, excise, exercise, franchise, guise, improvise, incise, reprise, revise, rise, supervise, surmise, surprise, televise, and wise.
 Some words spelled with -ize in American English are not used in British English. For example, from the noun burglar, the usual verb is formed by suffixation in American English (burglarize) but back-formation in British English (burgle).
 Conversely, the verb to prise (meaning "to force" or "to lever") is rarely used in North American English: pry is instead used, a back-formation from or alteration of prise to avoid confusion with the more common noun "prize". When it is used in Canada, it is spelled with an s, just as it is in British, Irish, Indian, Australian, New Zealand and European English, where its use is more common. (A topsail schooner built in Australia in 1829 was called Enterprize, in contrast with U.S. ships and spacecraft named "Enterprise".)

-yse, -yze
The ending -yse is British and -yze is American. Thus, in British English analyse, catalyse, hydrolyse and paralyse, but in American English analyze, catalyze, hydrolyze and paralyze.

Analyse was the more common spelling in 17th- and 18th-century English. Some dictionaries of the time however preferred analyze, such as John Kersey's of 1702, Nathan Bailey's of 1721 and Samuel Johnson's of 1755. In Canada, -yze is preferred, but -yse is also very common. In South Africa, Australia and New Zealand, -yse is the prevailing form.

English verbs ending in either -lyse or -lyze are not similar to the original Greek verb, which is λύω lýo ("I release"). Instead, they come from the noun form  lysis, with the -ise or -ize suffix. For example, analyse comes from French analyser, formed by haplology from the French analysiser, which would be spelled analysise or analysize in English.

Hart's Rules for Compositors and Readers at the University Press, Oxford states: "In verbs such as analyse, catalyse, paralyse, -lys- is part of the Greek stem (corresponding to the element -lusis) and not a suffix like -ize. The spelling -yze is therefore etymologically incorrect, and must not be used, unless American printing style is being followed."

-ogue, -og
British and other Commonwealth English use the ending -logue while American English commonly uses the ending -log for words like analog(ue), catalog(ue), dialog(ue), homolog(ue), etc. The -gue spelling, as in catalogue, is used in the US, but catalog is more common. In contrast, dialogue, epilogue, prologue, and monologue are extremely common spellings compared to dialog etc. in American English, although both forms are treated as acceptable ways to spell the words (thus the inflected forms, cataloged and cataloging vs. catalogued and cataloguing). Words such as demagogue, pedagogue, synagogue are seldom used without -ue even in American English.

In Australia, analog is standard for the adjective, but both analogue and analog are current for the noun; in all other cases the -gue endings strongly prevail, for example monologue, except for such expressions as dialog box in computing, which are also used in other Commonwealth countries. In Australia, analog is used in its technical and electronic sense, as in analog electronics. In Canada and New Zealand, analogue is used, but analog has some currency as a technical term (e.g., in electronics, as in "analog electronics" as opposed to "digital electronics" and some video-game consoles might have an analog stick). The -ue is absent worldwide in related words like analogy, analogous, and analogist.

Both British and American English use the spelling -gue with a silent -ue for certain words that are not part of the -ogue set, such as tongue (cf. tong), plague, vague, and league. In addition, when the -ue is not silent, as in the words argue, ague and segue, all varieties of English use -gue.

Doubled consonants
The plural of the noun bus is usually  buses, with busses a minor American variant. Conversely, inflections of the verb bus usually double the s in British (busses, bussed, bussing) but not American (buses, bused, busing). In Australia, both are common, with the American slightly more common.

Doubled in British English
The final consonant of an English word is sometimes doubled in both American and British spelling when adding a suffix beginning with a vowel, for example strip/stripped, which prevents confusion with stripe/striped and shows the difference in pronunciation (see digraph). Generally, this happens only when the word's final syllable is stressed and when it also ends with a lone vowel followed by a lone consonant. In British English, however, a final -l is often doubled even when the final syllable is unstressed. This exception is no longer usual in American English, seemingly because of Noah Webster. The -ll- spellings are nevertheless still deemed acceptable variants by both Merriam-Webster Collegiate and American Heritage dictionaries.
 The British English doubling is used for all inflections (-ed, -ing, -er, -est) and for the noun suffixes -er and -or. Therefore, British English usage is cancelled, counsellor, cruellest, labelled, modelling, quarrelled, signalling, traveller, and travelling. Americans typically use canceled, counselor, cruelest, labeled, modeling, quarreled, signaling, traveler, and traveling. However, for certain words such as cancelled, the -ll- spelling is very common in American English as well.
 The word parallel keeps a single -l- in British English, as in American English (paralleling, unparalleled), to avoid the unappealing cluster -llell-.
 Words with two vowels before a final l are also spelled with -ll- in British English before a suffix when the first vowel either acts as a consonant (equalling and initialled; in the United States, equaling or initialed), or belongs to a separate syllable (British di•alled and fu•el•ling; American di•aled and fu•el•ing).
 British woollen is a further exception due to the double vowel (American: woolen). Also, wooly is accepted in American English, though woolly prevails in both systems.
 The verb surveil, a back-formation from surveillance, always makes surveilled, surveilling.
 Endings -ize/-ise, -ism, -ist, -ish usually do not double the l in British English; for example, devilish, dualism, normalise, and novelist.
 Exceptions: duellist, medallist, panellist, tranquillise, and sometimes triallist in British English.
 For -ous, British English has a single l in scandalous and perilous, but the "ll" in libellous and marvellous.
 For -ee, British English has libellee.
 For -age, British English has pupillage but vassalage.
 American English sometimes has an unstressed -ll-, as in the UK, in some words where the root has -l. These are cases where the change happens in the source language, which was often Latin. (Examples: bimetallism, cancellation, chancellor, crystallize, excellent, raillery, and tonsillitis.)
 All forms of English have compelled, excelling, propelled, rebelling (notice the stress difference); revealing, fooling (note the double vowel before the l); and hurling (consonant before the l).
 Canadian and Australian English mostly follow British usage.

Among consonants other than l, practice varies for some words, such as where the final syllable has secondary stress or an unreduced vowel. In the United States, the spellings kidnaped and worshiped, which were introduced by the Chicago Tribune in the 1920s, are common, but kidnapped and worshipped prevail. Kidnapped and worshipped are the only standard British spellings. However, focused is the predominant spelling in both British and American English, focussed being just a minor variant in British English.

Miscellaneous:
 British calliper or caliper; American caliper.
 British jewellery; American jewelry. The word originates from the Old French word jouel (whose contemporary French equivalent is joyau, with the same meaning). The standard pronunciation  does not reflect this difference, but the non-standard pronunciation  (which exists in New Zealand and Britain, hence the Cockney rhyming slang word tomfoolery ) does. According to Fowler, jewelry used to be the "rhetorical and poetic" spelling in the UK, and was still used by The Times into the mid-20th century. Canada has both, but jewellery is more often used. Likewise, the Commonwealth (including Canada) has jeweller and the US has jeweler for a jewel(le)ry seller.

Doubled in American English
Conversely, there are words where British writers prefer a single l and Americans a double l. In American usage, the spelling of words is usually not changed when they form the main part (not prefix or suffix) of other words, especially in newly formed words and in words whose main part is in common use. Words with this spelling difference include
appall, enrollment, fulfill, fulfillment, installment, skillful, thralldom, willful. These words have monosyllabic cognates always written with -ll: pall, roll, fill, stall, skill, thrall, will. Cases where a single l nevertheless occurs in both American and British English include null→annul, annulment; till→until (although some prefer til to reflect the single l in until, sometimes using a leading apostrophe (til); this should be considered a hypercorrection as till predates the use of until); and others where the connection is not clear or the monosyllabic cognate is not in common use in American English (e.g., null is used mainly as a technical term in law, mathematics, and computer science).

In the UK, a single l is generally preferred in American forms distill, instill, enroll, and enthrallment, and enthrall, although ll was formerly used; these are always spelled with ll in American usage. The former British spellings dulness, instal, and fulness are now quite rare. The Scottish tolbooth is cognate with tollbooth, but it has a distinct meaning.

In both American and British usages, words normally spelled -ll usually drop the second l when used as prefixes or suffixes, for example all→almighty, altogether; full→handful, useful; well→welcome, welfare; chill→chilblain.

Both the British fulfil and the American fulfill never use -ll- in the middle (i.e., *fullfill and *fullfil are incorrect).

Johnson wavered on this issue. His dictionary of 1755 lemmatizes distil and instill, downhil and uphill.

Dropped "e"
British English sometimes keeps a silent "e" when adding suffixes where American English does not. Generally speaking, British English drops it in only some cases in which it is needed to show pronunciation whereas American English only uses it where needed.
 British prefers ageing, American usually aging (compare ageism, raging). For the noun or verb "route", British English often uses routeing, but in America routing is used. The military term rout forms routing everywhere. However, all of these words form "router", whether used in the context of carpentry, data communications, or the military. (e.g., "Attacus was the router of the Huns at ....")

Both forms of English keep the silent "e" in the words dyeing, singeing, and swingeing (in the sense of dye, singe, and swinge), to distinguish from dying, singing, swinging (in the sense of die, sing, and swing). In contrast, the verb bathe and the British verb bath both form bathing. Both forms of English vary for tinge and twinge; both prefer cringing, hinging, lunging, syringing.
 Before -able, British English prefers likeable, liveable, rateable, saleable, sizeable, unshakeable, where American practice prefers to drop the "-e";  but both British and American English prefer breathable, curable, datable, lovable, movable, notable, provable, quotable, scalable, solvable, usable, and those where the root is polysyllabic, like believable or decidable. Both systems keep the silent "e" when it is needed to preserve a soft "c", "ch", or "g", such as in cacheable, changeable, traceable; both usually keep the "e" after "-dge", as in knowledgeable, unbridgeable, and unabridgeable ("These rights are unabridgeable").
 Both abridgment and the more regular abridgement are current in the US, only the latter in the UK. Likewise for the word lodg(e)ment. Both judgment and judgement are in use interchangeably everywhere, although the former prevails in the US and the latter prevails in the UK except in the practice of law, where judgment is standard. This also holds for abridgment and acknowledgment. Both systems prefer fledgling to fledgeling, but ridgeling to ridgling. Acknowledgment, acknowledgement, abridgment and abridgement are all used in Australia; the shorter forms are endorsed by the Australian Capital Territory Government. Apart from when the "e" is dropped and in the word gaol and some pronunciations of margarine, "g" can only be soft when followed by an "e", "i", or "y".
The word "blue" always drops the "e" when forming "bluish" or "bluing".

Hard and soft "c"
A "c" is generally soft when followed by an "e", "i", or "y". One word with a pronunciation that is an exception in British English, "sceptic", is spelled "skeptic" in American English. See Miscellaneous spelling differences below.

Different spellings for different meanings
 dependant or dependent (noun): British dictionaries distinguish between dependent (adjective) and dependant (noun). In the US, dependent is usual for both noun and adjective, regardless of dependant also being an acceptable variant for the noun form in the US.
 disc or disk: Traditionally, disc used to be British and disk American. Both spellings are etymologically sound (Greek diskos, Latin discus), although disk is earlier. In computing, disc is used for optical discs (e.g., a CD, Compact Disc; DVD, Digital Versatile/Video Disc; MCA DiscoVision, LaserDisc), by choice of the group that coined and trademarked the name Compact Disc, while disk is used for products using magnetic storage (e.g., hard disks or floppy disks, also known as diskettes).
 enquiry or inquiry: According to Fowler, inquiry should be used in relation to a formal inquest, and enquiry to the act of questioning. Many (though not all) British writers maintain this distinction; the OED, in their entry dating from 1900, lists inquiry and enquiry as equal alternatives, in that order (with the addition of "public inquiry" in a 1993 addition). Some British dictionaries, such as Chambers 21st Century Dictionary, present the two spellings as interchangeable variants in the general sense, but prefer inquiry for the "formal inquest" sense. In the US, only inquiry is commonly used; the title of the National Enquirer, as a proper name, is an exception. In Australia, inquiry and enquiry are often interchangeable.
 ensure or insure: In the UK, Australia and New Zealand, the word ensure (to make sure, to make certain) has a distinct meaning from the word insure (often followed by against – to guarantee or protect against, typically by means of an "insurance policy"). The distinction is only about a century old. In American usage, insure may also be used in the former sense, but ensure may not be used in the latter sense. According to Merriam-Webster's usage notes, ensure and insure "are interchangeable in many contexts where they indicate the making certain or [making] inevitable of an outcome, but ensure may imply a virtual guarantee 'the government has ensured the safety of the refugees', while insure sometimes stresses the taking of necessary measures beforehand 'careful planning should insure the success of the party'."
 matt or matte: In the UK, matt refers to a non-glossy surface, and matte to the motion-picture technique; in the US, matte covers both.
 programme or program: The British programme is from post-classical Latin programma and French programme. Program first appeared in Scotland in 1633 (earlier than programme in England in 1671) and is the only spelling found in the US. The OED entry, updated in 2007, says that program conforms to the usual representation of Greek as in anagram, diagram, telegram etc. In British English, program is the common spelling for computer programs, but for other meanings programme is used. New Zealand also follows this pattern. In Australia, program has been endorsed by government writing standards for all meanings since the 1960s, and is listed as the official spelling in the Macquarie Dictionary; see also the name of The Micallef P(r)ogram(me). In Canada, program prevails, and the Canadian Oxford Dictionary makes no meaning-based distinction between it and programme. However, some Canadian government documents nevertheless use programme for all meanings of the word – and also to match the spelling of the French equivalent.
 tonne or ton: In the UK, Australia, Canada, and New Zealand, the spelling tonne refers to the metric unit (1,000 kilograms), which is the nomenclature used in SI units, whereas in the US the same unit is called a metric ton. The unqualified ton usually refers to the long ton in the UK and to the short ton in the US (but note that the tonne and long ton differ by only 1.6%, and are roughly interchangeable when accuracy is not critical; ton and tonne are usually pronounced the same in speech).
 metre or meter: In British English there is a distinction between metre as a unit of length, and a meter in the sense of an ammeter or a water meter, whereas the standard American spelling for both is "meter".

Different spellings for different pronunciations
In a few cases, essentially the same word has a different spelling that reflects a different pronunciation.

As well as the miscellaneous cases listed in the following table, the past tenses of some irregular verbs differ in both spelling and pronunciation, as with smelt (UK) versus smelled (US) (see American and British English grammatical differences: Verb morphology).

Past tense differences
In the UK, Ireland, Australia, New Zealand and Canada, it is more common to end some past tense verbs with a "t" as in learnt or dreamt rather than learned or dreamed. However, such spellings are also found in American English. However, in American English, burned and burnt have different usages.

Several verbs have different past tenses or past participles in American and British English:
The past tense of the verb "to dive" is most commonly found as "dived" in British, and New Zealand English. "Dove" is usually used in its place in American English. Both terms are understood in Canada and Australia, and may be found either in minority use or in regional dialect in America.
The past tense of the verb "to get" is "got" everywhere, but the past participle is "got" in British and New Zealand English but "gotten" in American and Canadian, and occasionally in Australian English. Both terms are understood, and may be found either in minority use or in regional dialect. One exception is in the phrase "ill-gotten", which is widely used everywhere. Another is the universal use of "have got" to indicate possession or necessity: "I have got a car", "I have got to go" (whereas "I have gotten a car" would mean "I have obtained a car", and "I have gotten to go" would mean "I have had the opportunity/privilege to go"). None of this affects "forget" and "beget", whose past participles are "forgotten" and "begotten" in all varieties.

Miscellaneous spelling differences
In the table below, the main spellings are above the accepted alternative spellings.

Compounds and hyphens
British English often prefers hyphenated compounds, such as anti-smoking, whereas American English discourages the use of hyphens in compounds where there is no compelling reason, so antismoking is much more common. Many dictionaries do not point out such differences. Canadian and Australian usage is mixed, although Commonwealth writers generally hyphenate compounds of the form noun plus phrase (such as editor-in-chief). Commander-in-chief prevails in all forms of English.

Compound verbs in British English are hyphenated more often than in American English.

 any more or anymore: In sense "any longer", the single-word form is usual in North America and Australia but unusual elsewhere, at least in formal writing. Other senses always have the two-word form; thus Americans distinguish "I couldn't love you anymore [so I left you]" from "I couldn't love you any more [than I already do]". In Hong Kong English, any more is always two words.
 for ever or forever: Traditional British English usage makes a distinction between for ever, meaning for eternity (or a very long time into the future), as in "If you are waiting for income tax to be abolished you will probably have to wait for ever"; and forever, meaning continually, always, as in "They are forever arguing". In British usage today, however, forever prevails in the "for eternity" sense as well, in spite of several style guides maintaining the distinction. American writers usually use forever regardless of which sense they intend (although forever in the sense of "continually" is comparatively rare in American English, having been displaced by always).
 near by or nearby: Some British writers make the distinction between the adverbial near by, which is written as two words, as in, "No one was near by"; and the adjectival nearby, which is written as one, as in, "The nearby house". In American English, the one-word spelling is standard for both forms.
 per cent or percent: It can be correctly spelled as either one or two words, depending on the Anglophone country, but either spelling must always be consistent with its usage. British English predominantly spells it as two words, so does English in Ireland and countries in the Commonwealth of Nations such as Australia, Canada, and New Zealand. American English predominantly spells it as one word. Historically, it used to be spelled as two words in the United States, but its usage is diminishing; nevertheless it is a variant spelling in American English today. The spelling difference is reflected in the style guides of newspapers and other media agencies in the US, Ireland, and countries of the Commonwealth of Nations. In Canada and Australia (and sometimes in the UK, New Zealand, other Commonwealth countries, and Ireland) percent is also found, mostly sourced from American press agencies.

Acronyms and abbreviations
Acronyms pronounced as words are often written in title case by Commonwealth writers, but usually as upper case by Americans: for example, Nasa / NASA or Unicef / UNICEF. This does not apply to abbreviations that are pronounced as individual letters (referred to by some as "initialisms"), such as US, IBM, or PRC (the People's Republic of China), which are virtually always written as upper case. However, sometimes title case is still used in the UK, such as Pc (Police Constable).

Contractions where the final letter is present are often written in British English without full stops/periods (Mr, Mrs, Dr, St, Ave). Abbreviations where the final letter is not present generally do take full stops/periods (such as vol., etc., i.e., ed.); British English shares this convention with the French: Mlle, Mme, Dr, Ste, but M. for Monsieur. In American and Canadian English, abbreviations like St., Ave., Mr., Mrs., Ms., Dr., and Jr., usually require full stops/periods. Some initials are usually upper case in the US but lower case in the UK: liter/litre and its compounds (2 L or 25 mL vs 2 l or 25 ml); and ante meridiem and post meridiem (10 P.M. or 10 PM vs 10 p.m. or 10 pm). Both AM/PM and a.m./p.m. are acceptable in American English, but U.S. style guides overwhelmingly prefer a.m./p.m.

Punctuation

The use of quotation marks, also called inverted commas or speech marks, is complicated by the fact that there are two kinds: single quotation marks (') and double quotation marks ("). British usage, at one stage in the recent past, preferred single quotation marks for ordinary use, but double quotation marks are again now increasingly common; American usage has always preferred double quotation marks, as have Canadian, Australian, and New Zealand English. It is the practice to alternate the type of quotation marks used where there is a quotation within a quotation.

The convention used to be, and in American English still is, to put full stops (periods) and commas inside the quotation marks, irrespective of the sense. British style now prefers to punctuate according to the sense, in which punctuation marks only appear inside quotation marks if they were there in the original. Formal British English practice requires a full stop to be put inside the quotation marks if the quoted item is a full sentence that ends where the main sentence ends, but it is common to see the stop outside the ending quotation marks.

See also

 Australian English
 Canadian English
 English language in England
 English in the Commonwealth of Nations
 English orthography
 Hong Kong English
 Hiberno-English
 Indian English
 Malaysian English
 Manx English
 New Zealand English
 Philippine English
 Scottish English
 Singaporean English
 South African English

Explanatory notes

References

Citations

General and cited sources 

 Chambers, J.K. (1998). "Canadian English: 250 Years in the Making", in The Canadian Oxford Dictionary, 2nd ed., p. xi.
 Clark, Joe (2009). Organizing Our Marvellous Neighbours: How to Feel Good About Canadian English (e-book, version 1.1). .
 Fowler, Henry; Winchester, Simon (introduction) (2003 reprint). A Dictionary of Modern English Usage (Oxford Language Classics Series). Oxford Press. .
 Hargraves, Orin (2003). Mighty Fine Words and Smashing Expressions. Oxford: Oxford University Press. 
 
 
 Oxford English Dictionary, 20 vols. (1989) Oxford University Press.
 
 Webster's Third New International Dictionary (1961; repr. 2002) Merriam-Webster, Inc.

External links

 The Chicago Manual of Style
 The Guardian style guide
 Word substitution list, by the Ubuntu English (United Kingdom) Translators team
 What will the English language be like in 100 years? (future outlook)

Spelling differences
English orthography
Internationalization and localization